Barbour Island River is a stream in the U.S. state of Georgia. It empties into Sapelo Sound.

Barbour Island River takes its name from the island of the same name along its course.

References

Rivers of Georgia (U.S. state)
Rivers of McIntosh County, Georgia